Abimbola (diminutive form as "Bimbo") is both a Yoruba surname and a unisex given name meaning: "born with wealth"

Notable people with the name include:
Elizabeth Abimbola Awoliyi (1910–1971), Nigerian physician, 
Victor Abimbola Olaiya (1930–2020), Nigerian musician
Bola Abimbola, Nigerian musician
Wande Abimbola (born 1932), Nigerian academic
Abimbola Adelakun, Nigerian writer
Abimbola Alao (born 1967), Nigerian writer
Abimbola Lagunju (born 1960), Nigerian writer
Abimbola Afolami, (born, 1986) British politician
Abimbola Ogunbanjo, Nigerian executive

Notable people with the diminutive name form include:
Bimbo Manuel, Nigerian actor
Bimbo Oloyede, Nigerian journalist
Bimbo Odukoya, Nigerian televangelist
Bimbo Akintola, Nigerian actress
Bimbo Oshin, Nigerian actress

References

Unisex given names
Yoruba given names
Yoruba-language surnames